Jom Anbeh (also Romanized as Jom Ānbeh; also known as Jomambā) is a village in Jaghin-e Shomali Rural District, Jaghin District, Rudan County, Hormozgan Province, Iran. At the 2006 census, its population was 1,349, in 268 families.

References 

Populated places in Rudan County